The Fire This Time may refer to:

Film and television
 The Fire This Time: Why Los Angeles Burned, a 1994 documentary film
  "The Fire This Time" (Law & Order), an episode of Law & Order

Literature
 The Fire This Time (book), an essay and poetry anthology
 The Fire This Time: U.S. War Crimes in the Gulf, a non-fiction book by Ramsey Clark

Music
 The Fire This Time, an indigenous American dub group
 "The Fire This Time", a song by Marisa Anderson from Still, Here

Albums
 The Fire This Time (album), a 1992 album by Lester Bowie's Brass Fantasy
 The Fire This Time, a 1994 album by Cyril Neville and the Uptown Allstars
 The Fire This Time (audio documentary), a 2002 audio documentary with accompaniment by various IDM and ambient artists

See also
 The Fire Next Time